Ghost Empire is a 2016 book by Richard Fidler. It is about the history of Constantinople up to the conquest by the Ottoman Empire interspaced with the experiences of Fidler and his son who took a trip to Istanbul in 2014.

Contents
Author's note
Timeline
Introduction

Radiant City 
Rome to Byzantium 
The Deep State 
Persian Nightmares 
Children of Ishmael 
Uncreated Light 
The Starlit Golden Bough 
The Fourth Crusade 
End of Days 
A Thing Not of This World 
The Artifice of Eternity.

Acknowledgements
Endnotes
Bibliography
Images credits
Index

Publication history
2016, Ghost Empire (492 pages), Australia, HarperCollinsPublishers Australia , hardback
2017, Ghost Empire: A Journey to the Legendary Constantinople (520 pages), USA, Pegasus Books ,  hardback

Reception
In a review of Ghost Empire, The Sydney Morning Herald wrote "Fidler is passionate about his subject and he knows it well. Though an amateur historian, the radio presenter and one-time comedy star handles this dauntingly complex material with dexterity.", noted "That's not to say there isn't a fair amount of breezy surface narration and a number of subjects that seem ticked off rather than explored.", and concluded "Fidler's story ... leaves its readers with a sense of faith in the renewing, illuminating, social powers of historical narrative."

The Canberra Times wrote "In the book, Fidler evokes the clash of civilisations, the fall of empires, the rise of Christianity and the knock-on effects throughout civilisation when Constantinople fell and became Istanbul. But he tells them in the context of sharing his discoveries with his son – a poignant chapter of family life." and The Australian called it an "extraordinarily ambitious book"

Les Carlyon named it one of his best reads of 2016.

Ghost Empire has also been reviewed by Kirkus Reviews. and Publishers Weekly,

It achieved the shortlists of the 2017 Australian Indie Book Award, and the 2017 Australian Booksellers Association Nielsen BookData Booksellers Choice Award.

References

History books about the Byzantine Empire
Australian travel books
2016 non-fiction books
21st-century history books
HarperCollins books